The Hands of the Dragon was a comic book released by  Atlas Comics in 1975.

Powers and abilities
Wu Teh and his brother Ling were augmented by the radiation they were exposed to from the explosion of the dormant bomb on top of Mt. Fuji. Though it is never shown exactly how this radiation changed them, it is implied that like their grandfather, they became full of vigor and strength. Beyond these abilities, Wu Teh was a skilled martial artist who mastered several forms of hand-to-hand combat while at the monastery in the Himalayas.

Equipment and paraphernalia
Wu Teh wears a medallion, given to him by his grandfather on his deathbed. The medallion was around his grandfather's neck when the explosion that caused him to gain strength and vigor happened. It contains some type of essence that, if applied, grants the recipient renewed stamina and vigor also.

References

Atlas/Seaboard Comics titles
1975 in comics
Martial arts comics